The  is an agency in the Japanese government, headed by the Chief Cabinet Secretary. It organizes the Cabinet's public relations, coordinates ministries and agencies, collects intelligence, and organizes miscellaneous other tasks for the Cabinet, including the Prime Minister's office (Kantei) and residence (Kōtei).

Organization

 Chief Cabinet Secretary
 3 Deputy Chief Cabinet Secretaries
 3 Assistant Chief Cabinet Secretaries
 4 separate department heads in: the Cabinet Public Relations Office, the Cabinet Intelligence and Research Office, the National Security Secretariat and the Cabinet Affairs Office
 Information Technology Policy Office
 Headquarters for the Promotion of Administrative reform
 Office for Pandemic Influenza and New Infection Diseases Preparedness and Response
 Comprehensive Ainu Policy Office
 Cabinet Public Relations Office
 National Center of Incident Readiness and Strategy for Cybersecurity
 Cybersecurity Strategic Headquarters

References

External links 
  

Government of Japan
1924 establishments in Japan